E-Groups are unique architectural complexes found among a number of ancient Maya settlements.  They are central components to the settlement organization of Maya sites and, like many other civic and ceremonial buildings, could have served for astronomical observations.  It has been a common opinion that the alignments incorporated in these structural complexes correspond to the sun's solstices and equinoxes. Recent research has shown, however, that the orientations of these assemblages are highly variable, but pertain to alignment groups that are widespread in the Maya area and materialized mostly in other types of buildings, recording different agriculturally significant dates.

Origin of the name 
E-Groups are named after "Group E" at the Classic period site of Uaxactun, which was the first one documented by Mesoamerican archaeologists.  At Uaxactun, the Group E complex consists of a long terraced platform with three supra-structures arranged along a linear axis oriented north-south.  The two smaller outlying structures flank the larger central temple.  A stairway leads down to a plaza formed by Uaxacatun's Pyramid E-VII.  Three stele immediately front the E-Group, and a larger stele is located midway between Group E and Pyramid E-VII. Each of the four stairways incorporated into the complex (the main central one and three leading up to each supra-structure) bears two side masks (for a total of 16).

From a point of observation on Pyramid E-VII, the three structures have the following orientation:

 North structure (Temple E-I) – in line with the sunrise at the Summer (June) solstice
 South structure (Temple E-III) – in line with the sunrise at the Winter (December) solstice
 Central structure (Temple E-II) – in line with the sunrise at the equinoxes (September and March)

As revealed by excavation reports, however, these alignments could not have been observationally functional, because they connect architectural elements from different periods.

Distribution in Mesoamerica 
E-Group structures are found at a number of sites across the Maya area, particularly in the lowlands region. The oldest-known E-Groups coincide with the earliest Maya ceremonial sites of the Preclassic period, indicative of the central role played by astronomical and administrative concerns in the very beginnings of Maya ceremonial construction and planning. The oldest documented E-Group in the Yucatan Peninsula is found at the site of Seibal. However, many earlier E Groups have been found in the Olmec region, western Maya Lowlands and along the Pacific coast in Chiapas.

Construction of E-groups continues on through the Classic period, with examples of these including the Lost World Pyramid at Tikal in the Petén Basin of northern Guatemala,  and Structure 5C-2nd at Cerros, in Belize.  Caracol, also in Belize and the site that defeated Tikal during the Middle Classic, has a large-scale E-Group located in the western portion of its central core.

Notes

References 

  
 
 

Maya architecture
Buildings and structures in Mesoamerica
Ancient astronomical observatories